Simon Langley-Evans is a British scientist who is currently Professor of Human Nutrition at the University of Nottingham.

Education
He obtained his BSc in Biochemistry and Microbiology from Royal Holloway and Bedford New College, University of London in 1986. His PhD was from the University of Southampton (1990).

Career
Langley-Evans was the head of the University of Nottingham School of Biosciences between 2016 and 2021.

Langley-Evans was the winner of the Nutrition Society Silver Medal in 2005.

In 2012 he was awarded a DSc from the University of Nottingham in recognition of his contribution to research into the early life origins of adult disease. His principal contribution was the development of experimental models to test the hypothesis that variation in maternal nutrition during pregnancy could programme long-term health and disease.

In addition to publishing more than 150 papers in scientific journals and has contributed to several books on early life programming as editor and author, Langley-Evans is the author of an academic textbook entitled Nutrition, Health and Disease: A Lifespan Approach, of which the third edition was published in 2021, and is the editor-in-chief of the Journal of Human Nutrition and Dietetics. Outreach work to further understanding of nutrition science has included participation in I'm A Scientist Get Me Out Of Here and provision of specialist advice for a children's book.

Selected publications 
 (open access)  (Cited 412 times, according to Google Scholar.  )

References 

Academics of the University of Nottingham
Alumni of the University of Southampton
Academic journal editors
British nutritionists
Year of birth missing (living people)
Living people
Alumni of Royal Holloway, University of London